was a senior officer in the Imperial Japanese Army during World War II.

Military career

Ranks Promotions

References

 http://www45160u.sakura.ne.jp/DB/阿部芳光
http://www.generals.dk/general/Abe/Yoshimitsu/Japan.html
 http://forum.valka.cz/viewtopic.php/title/Abe-Josimicu/t/145788

1868 births
1969 deaths